Hoge's worm lizard (Amphisbaena hogei) is a species of worm lizard in the family Amphisbaenidae. The species is endemic to Brazil.

Etymology
The specific name, hogei, is in honor of Belgian-Brazilian herpetologist Alphonse Richard Hoge.

Reproduction
A. hogei is oviparous.

References

Further reading
Gans C (2005). "Checklist and Bibliography of the Amphisbaenia of the World". Bulletin of the American Museum of Natural History (289): 1–130. (Amphisbaena hogei, new status, p. 150.
Vanzolini PE (1950). "Contribuições ao conhecimento dos lagartos brasileiros da familia Amphisbaenidae Gray, 1825. I. Sôbre uma nova subespécie insular da Amphisbaena darwinii D. & B., 1839 ". Papéis Avulsos de Zoologia, Museu de Zoologia da Universidade de São Paulo 9: 69–78. (Amphisbaena darwinii hogei, new subspecies). (in Portuguese).

Amphisbaena (lizard)
Reptiles described in 1950
Endemic fauna of Brazil
Reptiles of Brazil
Taxa named by Paulo Vanzolini